Brouillet is a French surname. Notable people with the surname include:

Chrystine Brouillet (born 1958), Canadian writer
Frank Brouillet (1928–2001), American politician
Luc Brouillet (born 1954), Canadian botanist
Raymond Brouillet (born 1933), Canadian politician

French-language surnames